The Vic is a common short name for the following:

 The Queen Victoria, a fictional public house in the BBC soap opera Eastenders
 The Vic Theatre, a music/cinema venue in Chicago, opened in 1912 as The Victoria Theatre

The Vic may also refer to:
 Various theatre venues with Vic or Victoria in their name, see Victoria Theatre (disambiguation)

See also
 Vic, a city in Catalonia, Spain
 VIC (disambiguation), including Vic or vic
 Victoria (disambiguation)